Lars Hernquist (14 December 1954) is a theoretical astrophysicist and Mallinckrodt Professor of Astrophysics at the Center for Astrophysics  Harvard & Smithsonian. He is best known for his research on dynamical processes in cosmology and galaxy formation/galaxy evolution.

Career and research
Hernquist's research involves the dynamics of galaxies and the effect of a merger driven model for galaxy evolution.  He is a world expert in simulating mergers of galaxies to demonstrate the expected appearance and morphology of the resulting body.  He defined the "Hernquist Profile", which is an analytic expression for the distribution of dark matter in galaxies.  Hernquist's research is largely computational with one of the world's largest supercomputers accessible for his research.

Awards
Hernquist was awarded the 2020 Gruber Prize in Cosmology jointly with Volker Springel, who together have made computer simulations "an indispensable tool for cosmologists, allowing them to test theories and locate fertile areas for further research."

References

Year of birth missing (living people)
Living people
American astronomers
Harvard University faculty
Members of the United States National Academy of Sciences
Lawrenceville School alumni

External links
 Stellar scattering and the formation of exponential discs in self-gravitating systems Wu et al. Formula (1) is the Hernquist profile (for dark matter halo)